The Symphony No. 95 in C minor (Hoboken I/95) is the third of the twelve London symphonies (numbers 93–104) written by Joseph Haydn.  It is the only one of the twelve London symphonies in a minor key, and is also the only one of them to lack a slow introduction.

It was completed in 1791 as one of the set of symphonies composed for his first trip to London. It was first performed at the Hanover Square Rooms in London during the season of 1791; the exact date of the premiere is unknown.

Movements
The work is in standard four-movement form and scored for flute, two oboes, two bassoons, two horns, two trumpets, timpani and strings.

Allegro moderato (sonata form; C minor, ending in C major)
Andante (variation form; E major)
Menuetto – Trio (ternary form, C minor, trio in C major)
Finale: Vivace (rondo form; C major)

The first movement opens with the main theme, which consists of two contrasting parts—the first is strong in character and the second is more lyrical. The transition to the relative major has elements of the head of the main theme. The secondary theme contrasts the main theme by being very subtle in nature, and has a dance-like rhythm. The exposition concludes with a strong codetta. The development is primarily built around the head of the main theme, which is thoroughly developed. The recapitulation omits the head of the main theme, and the secondary theme is recapitulated in C major, thus ending the movement in a major key. 

It is the only one of the London symphonies that does not begin with a slow introduction to the first movement.

The trio of the minuet is a solo for the cello.

The finale opens with the following theme:

The first two bars of this theme are the basis for an extensive section of counterpoint in the middle of the movement.

Symphony 095
Compositions in C minor
1791 compositions